Kyle Munro (born 29 November 2001) is a Scottish professional footballer who plays for East Kilbride, as a defender and winger.

Career
Munro began his career with Hamilton Academical, spending time on loan with Clydebank in 2019. He made his debut for Hamilton on 29 August 2020, in a 0–2 home defeat against Rangers. He made his first start on 12 September 2020 against Livingston, scoring the winning goal. He returned on loan to Clydebank in February 2022.

In June 2022 he signed for East Kilbride.

References

2001 births
Living people
Scottish footballers
Footballers from Glasgow
Hamilton Academical F.C. players
Clydebank F.C. players
East Kilbride F.C. players
Scottish Professional Football League players
Association football fullbacks
Association football wingers
Scottish Junior Football Association players
Lowland Football League players